The Cryptkeeper Five (sometimes referred to as CK5) are an American punk rock/rock and roll band formed in 1997 in Trenton, New Jersey.

History
Vocalist Johnny Ott, guitarist Jimmy Ray, and drummer D.T. Graves (on and off) have been in CK5 since its 1997 origin, with many different supporting players over the years. The trio played music together in a band called Navalistic Death prior to the Cryptkeeper Five as well. Johnny's first CK5-leaning lyrics were for a song called "Black Death A Go-Go." At the outset, the group were a "straight ahead punk rock band", according to D.T. Their first album, Dear Dr. X... I Wanna be the Creature (1997) not only reflects this musical direction, but also was characterized lyrically by a preoccupation with "B-movies." Although they have evolved since, they have retained a "raw" and unpremeditated approach to music, letting the music flow organically. This attitude is not, again according to D.T., to be confused with being content with "sounding like shit".

The band's name would appear to be a blended reference to the fictional "crypt-kicker five" from the Monster Mash, and the host of EC Comics's Tales From the Crypt. However, vocalist Johnny Ott has stated that this was only a subconscious influence, and that the name was instead a horror rock update of the pop/rock "Fives", such as Dave Clark Five and Jackson Five. Unlike those groups, CK5's name does not refer to the number of band members, which has fluctuated from between 3 and 7 musicians.

CK5 have toured extensively along the US east coast and midwest since their formation, they toured Europe and the UK in 2016, and continue to play frequent dates, internationally, to this day. The current lineup includes Johnny Ott (vocals/ guitar), Jimmy Ray (guitar/ vocals), D.T. Graves (drums/ vocals),  Mikey G (bass guitar/ vocals)', and Brian Mazzarini (drums).

The band's music was used in the 2007 movie Welcome to Dreadville II: Red in Dreadville written by Jason Patfield, directed by Michael Schmid and John Bienasz.

On December 13, 2014, CK5 played a benefit at the Brighton Bar for that legendary club's long time booker Jacko Monahan, who was battling necrotizing fasctitis.

Influences and musical style
In addition to The Ramones and The Misfits, the band counts Bruce Springsteen, Roy Orbison, and Tom Petty among its influences.

While other punk rock and horror punk bands have produced a blend of 1950s rock and Ramones/Misfits inspired punk, CK5 are unique for introducing a sax-including Jersey rock element to that mix. Regarding this mix of influences, a writer for Punk Globe Magazine, in reviewing Rise of the Palace Depression/Darker Days, suggested that a comparison to the E Street Band is valid, and that CK5's Doo wop usage is in a more similar vein to Frank Zappa than to Frankie Valli. In a 2002 interview, drummer D. T. Graves said of the music which inspires them: "All the great genres of rock- 50's rock, the girl groups of the 60's, the 70's punk, Jersey shore rock... all tend to rely on the same qualities. They tap into something that makes your heart skip a beat or two, the magical quality."

Their sound has inspired some colorful descriptions. Music journalist-author Gary Wien, who wrote that CK5's music is "most likely like nothing you would expect", described said music thusly: "Roy Orbison singing lead for the Ramones covering John Cafferty & The Beaver Brown Band". Other commenters have come up with "Elvis does the Monster Mash", and  "Jerry Lee Lewis (singing) for the Misfits"; a reviewer for punk fanzine Razorcake chose a somewhat more contemporary reference, writing "imagine Danzig fronting Rocket from the Crypt".

The Cryptkeeper Five in Published Books
Gary Wien, a New Jersey music journalist who specializes in writing about the music of his home state, included the Cryptkeeper Five's 2006 full length The Rise of the Palace Depression ("a tremendously interesting release with a sound completely its own") as one of the top 100 disks of the decade 2001-2010, alongside offerings by artists such as Bruce Springsteen, My Chemical Romance, Fountains of Wayne, and Bouncing Souls, in his book Are You Listening? The CK5 song "Sweet Baby Jane" was likewise listed as the 72nd  greatest Garden State offering of the same decade. The book was the product of 6 months of research for Wien, during which time he listened to over 2,200 releases by New Jersey artists.

CK5 were reviewed in the 2009 book Music to Die For by former Melody Maker journalist Mick Mercer, published by Cherry Red Books, as part of that book's sub-titular international "Last Great Underground Scene."

Fitting for a band that has been so inspired by some of its famous alumni, CK5 is one of many bands whose logo can be found represented among the collection of graffiti and stickers on the walls of CBGB in the coffee table book CBGB: Decades of Graffiti by Christopher D. Salyers. The band played the legendary club regularly during the time that both entities were extant.

Press Coverage
Steppin' Out Magazine/ Jersey Style columnist Josh Davidson has written that CK5 "plays a new brand of rock, drawing from some of its rawest composers like Chuck Berry, Eddie Cochran and Joey Ramone. "

Ray Lujan of influential punk rock periodical Maximum Rock n' Roll included CK5's Unbeatable Cry CD as one of his top 10 recent recordings in the March 28, 2012 issue.

Dan Armonaitis of Spartanburg Herald compared the band to The Dictators and Iggy and the Stooges.

A writer for the Trentonian referred to CK5 as "punk-a-billy giants".

Scott Cronick from The Press of Atlantic City opined that "when it comes down to it, there's nothing really ordinary about The Cryptkeeper Five".

Jose Diaz of Ink 19'' magazine noted that Johnny Ott has a "Elvis-by-way-of-the Misfits" bearing, and described the band's music as having a "muscular, loud, and fast garage punk sound with rockabilly influences."

Discography

Albums

|}

Split EPs

Compilation Appearances

References

External links
 
 

Horror punk groups
Punk rock groups from New Jersey
Musical groups established in 1997